Yeater Branch is a stream in Warren County in the U.S. state of Missouri. It is a tributary of Big Creek.

Yeater Branch has the name of Conrad Yeater, a pioneer citizen.

See also
List of rivers of Missouri

References

Rivers of Warren County, Missouri
Rivers of Missouri